Samuel Archibald (born 1978) is a Canadian writer. He is best known for his short story collection Arvida, which won the Prix Coup de cœur Renaud-Bray in 2012, and was defended by Bernard Landry in the 2013 edition of Le Combat des livres. Its English translation by Donald Winkler was a shortlisted nominee for the 2015 Scotiabank Giller Prize.

Born in Arvida, Quebec, Archibald is a professor of film and literature at the Université du Québec à Montréal. He was formerly married to writer Geneviève Pettersen.

Works
Arvida (2011)
Quinze pour cent (2013)

References

1978 births
Canadian male short story writers
Canadian short story writers in French
Writers from Saguenay, Quebec
French Quebecers
Living people
Academic staff of the Université du Québec à Montréal
21st-century Canadian short story writers
21st-century Canadian male writers